Norica Câmpean (born 22 March 1972, in Teiuș) is a retired female race walker from Romania.

Achievements

References

sports-reference

1972 births
Living people
People from Teiuș
Romanian female racewalkers
Athletes (track and field) at the 1996 Summer Olympics
Athletes (track and field) at the 2000 Summer Olympics
Athletes (track and field) at the 2004 Summer Olympics
Olympic athletes of Romania